Petar Argirov (19 February 1923 – 16 November 1989) was a Bulgarian footballer. He competed in the men's tournament at the 1952 Summer Olympics.

References

External links
 
 

1923 births
1989 deaths
Bulgarian footballers
Bulgaria international footballers
Olympic footballers of Bulgaria
Footballers at the 1952 Summer Olympics
Footballers from Sofia
Association football forwards
FC Lokomotiv 1929 Sofia players
PFC Levski Sofia players
PFC Minyor Pernik players
FC Septemvri Sofia players
Bulgarian football managers
PFC Lokomotiv Plovdiv managers
PFC Pirin Blagoevgrad managers
FC Lokomotiv 1929 Sofia managers
AC Omonia managers
PAS Giannina F.C. managers
Bulgarian expatriate football managers
Expatriate football managers in Cyprus
Expatriate football managers in Greece